Bowers railway station was a station opened in 1934 by the London and North Eastern Railway (LNER) on the Castleford–Garforth line, in the West Riding of Yorkshire, England. It was only open for 17 years, being closed in January 1951, though the line remained open until the 1990s for coal traffic from the nearby collieries.

History
The platform was only capable of accommodating two coaches and was situated the eastern side of the line (as at Kippax and Ledston), and served a new housing estate between the railway and Bowers Row Colliery. When opened in 1934, it was called Bowers Halt, but this suffix was dropped in 1937 and it was known thereafter simply as Bowers.

Passenger traffic along the line was sparse and in January 1951, British Railways closed the line to passenger traffic, though it remained open for coal traffic from the collieries next to the line until the 1990s.

References

External links
Location of the station on a 1947 navigable map

Disused railway stations in Leeds
Railway stations in Great Britain opened in 1934
Railway stations in Great Britain closed in 1951
Former London and North Eastern Railway stations
Allerton Bywater